HMAS Culgoa (K408/F408/A256), named for the Culgoa River, was a Modified  (or )-class frigate that served in the Royal Australian Navy (RAN).

Construction
Culgoa was laid down by Williamstown Dockyard, Melbourne on 15 July 1943, launched on 22 September 1945 by Mrs. Showers, wife of the Second Naval Member of the Australian Commonwealth Naval Board and completed on 24 December 1946. She was immediately placed in reserve until her commissioning on 1 April 1947.

Operational history
Culgoa served in the Korean War. She received the battle honour "Korea 1953" for this deployment.

Decommissioning and fate
Culgoa paid off into reserve on 15 April 1954, and used as an accommodation ship by personnel at  until she was sold for scrap to N. W. Kennedy of Vancouver, Canada on 15 February 1972. Culgoa left Sydney under tow for Taiwan in March 1972.

References

External links

Ships built in Victoria (Australia)
River-class frigates of the Royal Australian Navy
1945 ships